Switzerland competed at the 1932 Summer Olympics in Los Angeles, United States. Six competitors, all men, took part in eight events in four sports.

Medalists

Athletics

Fencing

One male fencer represented Switzerland in 1932.

Men's foil
 Paul de Graffenried

Men's épée
 Paul de Graffenried

Gymnastics

Art competitions

References

External links
Official Olympic Reports
International Olympic Committee results database

Nations at the 1932 Summer Olympics
1932
1932 in Swiss sport